Geoffrey Stewart Boulton  (born 28 November 1940) is a British geoscientist, and Regius Professor Emeritus of the University of Edinburgh.
He was awarded the 2006 Lyell Medal, by the Geological Society.
He was awarded the 2011 James Croll Medal. He was awarded the Seligman Crystal by the International Glaciological Society in 2001. Between 2007 and 2011 he was General Secretary of the Royal Society of Edinburgh, of which he has been a Fellow since 1989. He was elected to membership of the Academia Europaea in 2022

Life
A member of the Independent Climate Change Email Review Commission, and held the role of lecturer at the University of East Anglia from 1968 to 1986.

References

External links
https://web.archive.org/web/20120415034212/http://www.dnva.no/binfil/download.php?tid=50106

1940 births
Living people
Alumni of the University of Birmingham
Academics of the University of Edinburgh
Academics of the University of East Anglia
British geologists
Fellows of the Royal Society
Fellows of the Royal Society of Edinburgh
Officers of the Order of the British Empire
Recipients of the Royal Geographical Society Founder's Medal
Lyell Medal winners